The 2000 UCLA Bruins softball team represented the University of California, Los Angeles in the 2000 NCAA Division I softball season.  The Bruins were coached by Sue Enquist, in her twelfth season as head coach.  The Bruins played their home games at Easton Stadium and finished with a record of 46–12–1.  They competed in the Pacific-10 Conference, where they finished third with a 14–7 record.

The Bruins were invited to the 2000 NCAA Division I softball tournament, where they swept the Regional and then completed a run to the title game of the Women's College World Series where they fell to champion Oklahoma.

Personnel

Roster

Coaches

Schedule

Ranking movements

References

UCLA
UCLA Bruins softball seasons
2000 in sports in California
Women's College World Series seasons